Reach plc publishes many newspapers, magazines and news websites. This list of Reach plc titles is a non-exhaustive list of these. Before 2018, Reach plc was known as Trinity Mirror plc.  The list includes titles owned by the Mirror Group Newspapers (MGN), and those owned by both M.E.N Media and S&B Media, after both companies were purchased by Trinity Mirror as GMG Regional Media from the Guardian Media Group in 2010.

Mirror Group newspapers, M.E.N Media and S&B Media

National newspapers 
 Daily Express / Sunday Express
 Daily Mirror / Sunday Mirror
 Daily Record / Sunday Mail (Scotland)
 Daily Star / Daily Star Sunday
 Irish Daily Star
 The Sunday People
 Western Mail / Wales on Sunday (Wales)

Local and regional newspapers 
Papers on the same line usually have generalised content and/or have the same team of reporters and editor.
 Accrington Observer
 Airdrie and Coatbridge Advertiser
 Anfield & Walton Star
 Ayrshire Post
 Barking & Dagenham Yellow Advertiser
 Bexley Mercury
 Birmingham Post / Birmingham Mail / Sunday Mercury
 Blairgowrie Advertiser
 Bootle Times
 Bracknell Standard
 Brent & Wembley Leader
 Bristol Post
 Buckinghamshire Examiner / Buckinghamshire Advertiser
 Burton Mail
 Business 7
 Chester Chronicle
 Chronicle Extra (Newcastle upon Tyne)
 Colne Valley Chronicle
 Coventry Telegraph
 Crewe Chronicle
 Crosby Herald
 Derby Evening Telegraph
 Dover Express
 Dumfries and Galloway Standard
 Ealing Gazette
 Ealing Informer
 Ealing Leader
 East Kilbride News
 Ellesmere Port Pioneer
 Enfield Advertiser
 Enfield Gazette
 Evening Chronicle   (Newcastle upon Tyne)
 Evening Gazette (Teesside)
 Express & Echo
 Formby Times
 Fulham & Hammersmith Chronicle
 Galloway News
 Gloucester Citizen
 Gloucestershire Echo
 Hamilton Advertiser
 Haringey Advertiser
 Harrow & Wembley Observer
 Harrow Informer
 Harrow Leader
 Havering Yellow Advertiser (Romford)
 Heywood Advertiser
 Highdown Books
 Hinckley Times
 Hounslow Borough Chronicle
 Hounslow, Chiswick & Whitton Informer
 Huddersfield District Chronicle
 Huddersfield Examiner
 Hull Daily Mail
 Ilford & Redbridge Yellow Advertiser
 Irish Daily Mirror
 Irish Daily Star (50% ownership) 
 Irvine Herald
 Kensington & Chelsea Informer
 Kilmarnock Standard
 Leicester Mercury
 Lewisham & Greenwich Mercury
 Liverpool Echo
 Loughborough Echo
 Maghull Star
 Manchester Evening News
 Manchester Metro News
 Metro Scotland
 Mid Devon Gazette
 Middleton Guardian
 Mitcham, Morden & Wimbledon Post
 Neath Guardian
 North Devon Journal
 North East Manchester Advertiser
 North Wales Daily Post
 Nottingham Post
 Oldham Advertiser
 Ormskirk Advertiser
 Paisley Daily Express
 Paisley Daily Express
 Perthshire Advertiser
 Prestwich Advertiser
 Reading Post
 Rochdale Observer
 Rossendale Free Press
 Runcorn & Widnes Weekly News
 Rutherglen Reformer
 Salford Advertiser
 Scottish Business Insider
 Slough Express
 South Liverpool Merseymart
 South Manchester Reporter
 South Wales Echo
 South Wales Evening Post
 Southport Visiter
 Staines Informer
 Stirling Observer
 Stockport Express / (Macclesfield Express / Wilmslow Express / The Sentinel (Staffordshire))
 Strathearn Herald
 Streatham, Clapham & West Norwood Post
 Sunday Sun (Newcastle Upon Tyne)
 Surrey Advertiser
 Surrey Herald
 Surrey Mirror Advertiser
 Sutton & Epsom Post
 Tameside Advertiser / Glossop Advertiser
 The Crawley News
 The Glaswegian
 The Journal  (Newcastle upon Tyne)
 The Lennox Herald
 The Press (Barnet and Hendon)
 The Wharf (Canary Wharf)
 Uxbridge & Hillingdon Leader
 Uxbridge Gazette
 Walton & Weybridge Informer
 West Lothian Courier
 Wishaw Press

Digital online brands 
Reach has launched websites under the Live brand:
 Aberdeen Live
 Belfast Live
 Bristol Live
 Buzz.ie (50% owned)
 Cheshire Live
 Cork Beo
 Devon Live
 Dublin Live
 Edinburgh Live
 Examiner Live (Huddersfield)
 football.london
 Galway Beo
 Glasgow Live
 Gloucestershire Live
 Hampshire Live
 Hull Live
 Lancs Live (LancsLive)
 Leeds Live
 Mylancs.liveLondon
 Plymouth Live
 RSVP Live
 Somerset Live
 Surrey Live
 SussexLive
Wales Online

Other Reach non-news websites include:-

 Hopsmore Craft Beer Club
 Memory Lane
 InYourArea
 Fish 4 Jobs

Previously owned titles 
It used to own a 43% share of The Independent.

It owned the News Letter, Donegal Democrat and Derry Journal until late 2003 when they were sold to the newly formed
Local Press Ltd which was then sold to Johnston Press which was then acquired by JPIMedia.

References 

Lists of newspapers published in the United Kingdom
Reach plc